West Lakes Academy is a secondary school with a sixth form and sponsored academy status located in the town of Egremont in Cumbria, England. The academy is sponsored by Sellafield Ltd, the Nuclear Decommissioning Authority and the University of Central Lancashire.

The academy is a member of the West Lakes Multi-Academy Trust.

West Lakes Academy was formed in 2008 from the merger of Wyndham School, which was  built and opened in the 1960s, with Ehenside School. West Lakes Academy opened on 1 September 2008. The academy is on the site of the old Wyndham School, and has been fully rebuilt, moving into the new buildings at Easter 2012.

Principal
The principal of West Lakes Academy is Mrs Abby Deeks who’s new position (previously Vice-Principal) was announced in June 2022 , ahead of the 2022-2023 academic year.

New Building
In 2012 West Lakes Academy moved into a new £26 million building in Egremont. All classrooms face outwards from open learning areas on each of the three floors of the building. The academy focuses on education specialisms of technologies, science and performing arts.

Along with the new building came many new resources including computing resources which, together with the iPad program for all students supported by parental contributions, allows students of West Lakes Academy to express their creative learning.

Ofsted
The academy was last inspected by Ofsted in March 2017 and was judged 'Outstanding' in all areas of the inspection. Previously it was judged 'Good' in February 2013 and 'Satisfactory' in 2009.

References

External links
 West Lakes Academy website
West Lakes Academy Ofsted Report 2017

Secondary schools in Cumbria
Academies in Cumbria
Egremont, Cumbria